The Jefferson Awards Foundation was created in 1972 by the American Institute for Public Service. The Jefferson Awards are given at both  local and national levels. Local winners are ordinary people who do extraordinary things without expectation of recognition. Local winners come from national networks of "Media Partners" and "Corporate Champions", from the associated "Students In Action", Lead360, and the GlobeChangers programs.  The Jefferson Awards Foundation is led by its CEO, Hillary Schafer, its president, Sam Beard, and its chairman, Jack Russi, in conjunction with the Foundation's board of governors.

National awards 
The awards are presented each year during a ceremony in Washington, D.C. where a broad array of honorees are recognized. Also recognized are organizations – companies that represent the pinnacle in corporate citizenship and academic institutions that best reflect the Jeffersonian ideals of citizen involvement.

History
In 1972, Jacqueline Kennedy Onassis, U.S. Senator Robert Taft Jr., and Samuel Beard founded the Jefferson Awards for Public Service to establish a prize for public and community service. The Jefferson Awards are led by the Board of Selectors who choose the national winners and oversee the activities of the organization. Co-founder, Sam Beard, is currently the President & CEO.

Jefferson Awards Foundation 
The Jefferson Awards Foundation is a non-profit organization that "recognizes, inspires and activates volunteerism and public service in communities, workplaces and schools across America."

List of all past national winners

See also
 List of awards for volunteerism and community service

References 

American awards
Awards established in 1972
1972 establishments in the United States